Acinetobacter nosocomialis is a gram-negative, strictly aerobic bacterium from the genus Acinetobacter isolated from a patient at MetroHealth in Cleveland, Ohio. Acinetobacter nosocomialis belongs to the Acinetobacter calcoaceticus-baumannii complex.

References

External links
Type strain of Acinetobacter nosocomialis at BacDive -  the Bacterial Diversity Metadatabase	

Moraxellaceae
Bacteria described in 2011